MacArthur High School may refer to one of several high schools in the United States:

Douglas MacArthur High School (San Antonio, Texas)
MacArthur High School (New York) — Levittown, New York
MacArthur High School (Irving, Texas)
MacArthur High School (Harris County, Texas)
Miami MacArthur South Senior High School
MacArthur High School (Illinois) — Decatur, Illinois
MacArthur High School (Oklahoma) — Lawton, Oklahoma

See also:
McArthur High School